Thomas Pleisch (17 December 1913 – 16 March 1936) was a Swiss ice hockey player who competed for the Swiss national team at the 1936 Winter Olympics in Garmisch-Partenkirchen.

References

External links
Thomas Pleisch statistics at Sports-Reference.com

1913 births
1936 deaths
Ice hockey players at the 1936 Winter Olympics
Olympic ice hockey players of Switzerland
Swiss ice hockey right wingers